De Witte Waan  is a 1984 Dutch film directed by Adriaan Ditvoorst. Its USA title is White Madness.

Cast
 Thom Hoffman ... Lazlo 
 Pim Lambeau ... Moeder 
 Louise Ruys ... Tante 
 Guusje van Tilborgh ... Jasja 
 Hans Croiset ... Portier / Man ongeluk 
 Jules Croiset ... Vader 
 Pamela Koevoets ... Dokter 
 Hilde Van Mieghem ... Lili 
 Joe Hennes ... Fuji 
 Luk van Mello ... Dealer 
 Theo van Gogh ... Junk

External links 
 

Dutch drama films
1984 films
1980s Dutch-language films
Films directed by Adriaan Ditvoorst